The Driver class were a class of  paddlewheel steam sloops of the British Royal Navy. Six Driver-class ships were ordered in 1840 and a further ten in March 1841, although only six were built. Five were ordered in 1847, but all were either built as paddle frigates or cancelled. Two wrecked in service, while the rest served until being retired and were either broken up or sold.

Design
The ships were designed by Sir William Symonds.

Propulsion
Power was provided by a two-cylinder direct-acting steam engine driving paddle wheels. Spiteful had a side-lever steam engine, Devastation had a 4-cylinder 'Siamese' steam engine and Sphinx had a 2-cylinder oscillating steam engine. The engines developed between 280 and 300 nominal horsepower, apart from Devastation (400 nhp) and Sphinx (500 nhp). All the ships were capable of about  under steam, with the more powerful Devastation and Sphinx making 10 or 12 knots. A brig rig was fitted for operating under sail.

Armament
All three ships were armed with two  (84 cwt) guns on pivot mounts, two 68-pounder (64 cwt) guns and two 42-pounder (22 cwt) carronades. In 1856 the armament was changed to a single 10-inch pivot gun, a 68-pounder (95 cwt) gun and four 32-pounder (42 cwt) guns.  Later, the 68-pounder was replaced by a 110 pdr Armstrong gun breech-loading gun.

Crew
They had a complement of approximately 149 men, increasing later to 160.

Construction 
Six Driver-class ships were ordered in 1840 and a further ten in March 1841, although only six were built. Five were ordered in 1847, but all were either built as paddle frigates or cancelled.

Ships

Notes

References

Works cited

 

Paddle sloops of the Royal Navy
Sloop classes